André Negrão (born 17 June 1992, Campinas, São Paulo, Brazil) is a Brazilian driver in the World Endurance Championship (WEC), world champion in the WEC's superseason 2018/2019 and twice winner in the 24 Hours of Le Mans (2018 and 2019) in the LMP2 class.

André is in the LMH Class in the FIA World Endurance Championship, driving with Alpine. He shares the Alpine A480 with French drivers Matthieu Vaxivière and Nicolas Lapierre. Negrão has driven with the team since 2017, when the team was named “Signatech Alpine Matmut” in the LMP2 Class, now named only “Alpine” – with the same name as the Formula One team.

Early career 
Negrão was born in Campinas, in São Paulo state. He started his trajectory in motorsports when he was 12 years old, although his family has a tradition in Brazilian motorsports. Guto, his father, Xandy, his uncle, and Xandinho, his cousin, are race drivers too.

When Negrão accompanied his cousin at Granja Viana's 500 Miles Kart, in 2003, he started his career in motorsports. After some seasons in karting, Negrão was Brazilian Kart's runner-up in 2006, and started in European motorsports two years later, in Formula Renault 2.0. He also ran in the Formula Renault Winter Series in the same year, finishing 3th.

One year later, André Negrão raced in the Eurocup Formula Renault 2.0, and the Italian and Swiss championships' division, as well as some South American Formula 3 rounds. In 2010, he competed in the Eurocup Formula Renault 2.0 and British Formula Renault, in addition to racing in Italian Formula Abarth and the Formula 3 Brazil Open.

Negrão stepped up to the World Series by Renault 3.5 in 2011, remaining in 2012 and 2013, and then returning in 2015. In 2014 and 2015, he ran in GP2, the current Formula 2. One year later, Negrão raced in Indy Lights and received a test in IndyCar.

Sportscar career 
In 2017, Alpine invted the Brazilian to move to the WEC.

Negrão won twice the legendary 24 Hours of Le Mans, the main endurance race of the world, in the LMP2 class in 2018 and 2019, beside Nicolas Lapierre and Pierre Thiriet. They also won the 2018–19 WEC super-season in the same class.

In 2021, Negrão drove in Hypercar, WEC's new main class, with Alpine Elf Matmut. He shared the Alpine A480 with French drivers Matthieu Vaxivière and Nicolas Lapierre and finished third in the championship.

For the 2022 season, Negrão, Lapierre and Vaxivière returned to Alpine to race in the WEC. The squad began the season well, winning the season opener in Sebring before finishing second at Spa. Problems with the car meant that Negrão and his teammates would only take fourth place in the 24 Hours of Le Mans, although a victory in Monza put the team into the lead of the championship. Despite finishing on the podium in the final two races, Alpine placed second behind the Toyota Nr. 7 car, with a power reduction as a result of the BoP system having played a part in the team's lack of pace at the end of the year.

Negrão and Alpine returned to the LMP2 class in 2023, as the Brazilian was partnered by experienced Mexican Memo Rojas and British rookie Olli Caldwell.

Racing record

Career summary

† As Negrão was a guest driver, he was ineligible to score points.
* Season still in progress.

Complete Eurocup Formula Renault 2.0 results
(key) (Races in bold indicate pole position) (Races in italics indicate fastest lap)

Complete Formula Renault 3.5 Series results
(key) (Races in bold indicate pole position) (Races in italics indicate fastest lap)

Complete GP2 Series results
(key) (Races in bold indicate pole position) (Races in italics indicate fastest lap)

† Driver did not finish the race, but was classified as he completed over 90% of the race distance.

American open-wheel racing results

Indy Lights

Complete FIA World Endurance Championship results

* Season still in progress.

Complete 24 Hours of Le Mans results

Complete European Le Mans Series results

References

External links
 Andre Negrao Official website
 Negrão career statistics at Driver Database

1992 births
Living people
Racing drivers from São Paulo
Portuguese Formula Renault 2.0 drivers
Formula Renault 2.0 WEC drivers
Italian Formula Renault 2.0 drivers
Formula Renault 2.0 Alps drivers
Formula 3 Sudamericana drivers
Formula Renault Eurocup drivers
Formula Abarth drivers
World Series Formula V8 3.5 drivers
Formula Renault 2.0 NEC drivers
GP2 Series drivers
Brazilian GP2 Series drivers
Indy Lights drivers
24 Hours of Le Mans drivers
FIA World Endurance Championship drivers
Draco Racing drivers
Arden International drivers
European Le Mans Series drivers
Cram Competition drivers
Hitech Grand Prix drivers
Signature Team drivers